Battle of Changsha (Chinese: 战长沙) is a 2014 Chinese television series produced by Hou Hongliang and directed by Kong Sheng. The story is set against the backdrop of the Battle of Changsha in 1939 during World War II. Starring Wallace Huo and Yang Zi, the series premiered on CCTV-8 on 14 July ended its run on 31 July 2014.

The series was a critical success, and was the highest rated drama on major streaming website Douban.

Synopsis
Battle of Changsha tells a story about an ordinary family in Changsha, Hunan Province, China, coping with the Anti-Japanese war between 1938 and 1945, reflecting Chinese people's lives during that ill-fated period.

With the Japanese air-raid and students’ protest as the background, the drama begins with the narration of Hu Xiangxiang, a 16-year-old high school student, spoiled but innocent and inner-directed girl who is running away from a blind date set up by her brother-in-law, Xue Junshan, who's arranging to marry her off, then leave Changsha to avoid the war there. Besides, Hu Xiangxiang's family also want to find an escape to protect her twin brother, Hu Xiangjiang (also known as Xiao Man). The person for the blind date is Gu Qingming, a senior Kuomintang (KMT) strategy adviser of the battle who is totally different from those people who want to stay away from the war. He is eager to fight against the Japanese even though his family, especially his father is strongly against him to go into the battle instead of going abroad to save his life.

They didn't start off on good terms and Xue Junshan had to pick another man as the fiancé for Hu Xiangxiang. In the meantime, then Chinese president Chiang Kai-shek demanded a scorched-earth policy in an attempt to stop the Japanese from advancing, but the policy went terribly wrong. As a result, the whole city was burnt to ashes even before the Japanese troops’ intruding. Approximately 30,000 of people were burned to death in their sleep including Xiangxiang's fiancé and family.

Hu Xiangxiang is still fairly ignorant about what a war is really like and all she wants to do is escape. However, during the  times of war, the 16-year-old girl is forced to grow up quickly. After seeing a series of deaths of family members and killings carried out by Japanese troops, Xiangxiang and Xiao Man get themselves involved into the war. She chose to be a nurse in order to save lives as much as possible. They are also deeply touched by the constant help from Gu Qingming whenever needed and his passion to save the country. The romance between Xiangxiang and Gu Qingming blossoms in the most chaotic time of China.

Cast

Main
Wallace Huo as Gu Qingming (Gu Shaohuan)
A senior Kuomintang (KMT) strategy adviser attached to the 50th Division. He holds the rank of Major.
Yang Zi as Hu Xiangxiang
Daughter of a tailoress. Gu Qingming's wife.

Supporting

Hu Family members
Wang Caiping as Grandmother Hu
Hu Changning's mother. A skilled tailor. 
Yang Xinming as Hu Changning
Xiangjun, Xiangjiang and Xiangxiang's father. A courageous and humble intellectual.
Mu Liyan as Liu Duoci
Xiangjun, Xiangjiang and Xiangxiang's mother. A tailor trained by Grandma Hu.
Niu Junfeng as Hu Xiangjiang (Xiaoman) 
Xiangxiang's twin brother.
Liu Zhenjun as Liu Xiuxiu
Liu Duoci's niece, Minghan's younger sister. 
Gao Xin as Liu Minghan
Liu Duoci's nephew, Xiuxiu's older brother. Hu Xiangjun's cousin and former boyfriend.
Ren Chengwei as Xue Junshan
Hu Xiangjun's husband. He is a corrupt security officer, who uses his connections to make a profit. He holds the rank of captain, but wears the rank insignia of a lieutenant.
Zuo Xiaoqing as Hu Xiangjun
Xiangxiang's older sister.
Ying Yixuan as Xue Ping'an
Junshan and Xiangjun's son.
Wang Yongquan as Hu Bingquan
Wang Hong as Hu Xiaoqiu
Hu Bingquan's adopted son.
Sun Mengjia as Shuilan
Li Zefeng as Hu Xiangping
Zhang Moxi as Jingyan
Zhang Yijie as Hu Xiangshui

Gu Family
Wang Shuangbao as Xu Quan
Qingming's uncle, Junshan's superior.
Lu Xia as Gu Qinyun
Qingming's older sister.

Others
Kuang Muye as Little Brother Mo (Su Tie)
Junshan's sidekick, aide, later Qingming's aide.
Ma Bo as Chen Chu (Xiao Hei)
Junshan's sidekick, later a spy for the Japanese.
Li Wenjing as Mu Huarong (Xiao Mu)
Qingming's aide.
Li Peiming as Fang Xianjue
Commander of the Tenth Corps of the Kuomintang.
Ying Zi as Jin Feng
Xiangxiang's classmate, Xiaoman's crush.
Sun Hanwen as Sheng Chengzhi
Xiangxiang's betrothed.

Ratings 

 Highest ratings are marked in red, lowest ratings are marked in blue

References

External links
 Battle of Changsha's Official Weibo
 Battle of Changsha's Website

Television shows based on Chinese novels
Chinese period television series
Chinese war television series
Chinese romance television series
2014 Chinese television series debuts
China Central Television original programming
Second Sino-Japanese War television drama series
Television series by Daylight Entertainment
Television shows set in Hunan